The Status Quo Ante Synagogue in Trnava was completed in either 1891 or 1897 at Halenárska Street in Trnava, Slovakia.  The synagogue was built in the Moorish-Byzantine style. The city had two Jewish congregations: an Orthodox and a Status Quo one; the building served the latter. The synagogue was devastated in World War II. Today the synagogue is the center of contemporary art, housing the Ján Koniarek gallery, and hosts a number of exhibitions and concerts.

Inside, apse and chapel are surrounded by a gallery for women, which is supported by cast iron columns with composite capitals. In the center of the chapel is a glass dome with its original design.  Historically and to this day the synagogue is one of the most characteristic and most original buildings in the city. Its most characteristic features are the towers of spherical domes.

The synagogue is no longer active.  In front of the building is a monument dedicated to the Jewish victims of World War II.

Images

References

External links
Controversy in Use of Trnava Orthodox Synagogue

Synagogues in Slovakia
Buildings and structures in Trnava
19th-century architecture in Slovakia
Synagogue buildings with domes
Synagogues completed in the 1890s
Moorish Revival synagogues
Byzantine Revival synagogues